The 1988 Summer Paralympics medal table is a list of National Paralympic Committees (NPCs) ranked by the number of gold medals won by their athletes during the 1988 Summer Paralympics, held in Seoul, South Korea, from October 15 to 24, 1988.

Medal table

The ranking in this table is based on information provided by the International Paralympic Committee (IPC) and is consistent with IPC convention in its published medal tables. By default, the table is ordered by the number of gold medals the athletes from a nation have won (in this context, a "nation" is an entity represented by a National Paralympic Committee). The number of silver medals is taken into consideration next and then the number of bronze medals. If nations are still tied, equal ranking is given and they are listed alphabetically by IPC country code.

To sort this table by nation, total medal count, or any other column, click on the  icon next to the column title.

References

See also
 1988 Summer Olympics medal table

External links
International Paralympic Committee

Paralympics Summer
Paralympics
medal table
Paralympics